A unit supply specialist is a job title in the US Army that includes the "general upkeep" and maintenance of supplies and equipment. There are five skill levels. Training includes 8 weeks  at Fort Lee, Virginia.

References

See also
 Military Occupational Specialty

Military specialisms
Military personnel